Rochester FC is a men's soccer club based in Rochester, Minnesota. It competes in the UPSL Midwest Region's Conference.Rochester FC's colors are sky blue and navy. Rochester FC has an Elite Development youth academy for boys.

History
Rochester FC was founded in 2018 by Midhat Mujic and Muharem Dedic. Rochester FC will be joining UPSL's North Conference as an expansion team.

Front office

 Midhat Mujic/Muharem Dedic - Owners/Presidents
 Deb Nichols-Hare - Director of Coaching
 Abdul Noor - Director of Academy

Current roster 
Note: Flags indicate national team as defined under FIFA eligibility rules. Players may hold more than one non-FIFA nationality.

Staff  
  Muharem Dedic– Coach
  Todd Penz– Coach
  Deb Nichols-Hare– Director of Coaching/Goalkeeping Coach
  Abdul Noor– Director of Youth Academy/U-14 Coach
  Amela Mujanovic– Director of Social Media/Advertising/Merchandise.

References

External links
 

Association football clubs established in 2018

2018 establishments in Minnesota
Soccer clubs in Minnesota
United Premier Soccer League teams
Rochester, Minnesota